Pleasantville High School is in the village of Pleasantville within the town of Mount Pleasant in Westchester County, New York, United States. It is a comprehensive high school that provides a broad range of academic and educational programs. A full complement of extra-curricular activities including the performing and visual arts, sports, and academic and service clubs. The high school was ranked 122nd on Newsweeks 2015 list of top U.S. high schools.

The Pleasantville High School football team has been in existence at least since 1922 and has won one state championship and many county titles. In 2013 the football team won the Section 1 Class B title with a win over Our Lady of Lourdes. The 2016 team won a Regional Championship, defeating New Paltz 56-20 before falling in the State Semi-Finals. The 2017 Panthers football team won the Class B NYSPHSAA Championship defeating Chenango Forks 28–14 at the Carrier Dome in Syracuse, NY. This was the first State Championship in program history. Just months later many of the same athletes won their second State Championship in the school year winning the NYSPHSAA Lacrosee Championship by a score of 16–2 over PenYan. In 2019, the Girls varsity soccer team won the state championship after defeating Central Valley Academy in a close 3-2 victory. In 2021, Pleasantville High School's football team made it to the state championship again, but was defeated 21-12 by Maine-Endwell.

The men's basketball team has also won several county championships. The Pleasantville swim team has won the division 1 championship twice, most recently in 2007. The Pleasantville track team has also won the league title two years in a row.

Notable alumni

 Matt Ballinger, musician, member of Dream Street
 Dave Barry, author and columnist
 Ali Ewoldt, actor
 Otis Hill, basketball player
 Kyle Lowder, actor
 Jessica Tom, winner of the Fourteenth Season of Food Network Star

References

External links

Educational institutions in the United States with year of establishment missing
Public high schools in Westchester County, New York